Krasnoye is a rural locality (a selo) and the administrative center of Krasnensky District of Belgorod Oblast, Russia. Population:

References

Notes

Sources

Rural localities in Krasnensky District
Korotoyaksky Uyezd